The Baldwin DRS-6-6-1500 was a diesel-electric locomotive rated at , that rode on a pair of three-axle trucks, having a C-C wheel arrangement.

Original buyers

References
 

DRS-6-6-1500
C-C locomotives
Diesel-electric locomotives of the United States
Railway locomotives introduced in 1948
Locomotives with cabless variants
Standard gauge locomotives of the United States